Thomas Winther Andersen (born 29 April 1969) is a Norwegian-born, now Amsterdam-based jazz bassist, married to jazz singer Henriette Andersen.

Career 
Winther Andersen was born in Oslo, Norway. He toured extensively in Europe and the USA with different musicians and bands, like Lee Konitz, Jimmy Halperin, Sheila Jordan, Jasper Blom, Robert Rook, Michiel Borstlap. He graduated from Amsterdam Conservatory 1993 and supplemented with a master at the Conservatory of Den Hague 1994. In 1995 he received a grant from the Dutch foundation "Fonds Podiumkunsten", for the continuation of his studies in New York under guidance of Sal Mosca. He has composed numerous pieces for various jazz ensembles, music for large ensemble and at the same time composed chamber music.

His compositions were recorded for the Norwegian and Dutch radio and many of them are recorded on CD like his solo album Too Much Bass? (2002), as band leader: Line Up (1998) and Out From A Cool Storage (2004) within «Line Up», Sketch (1999) within «Sketch», Hymn For Fall (2006) within «Robert Rook Trio»,  Patchwork (2010), Spinnaker (2012) Flotsam (2019) within «Winther-Storm».

Discography

Solo albums 
2002: Too Much Bass? (NorCD)

As band leader 
Within "Winther-Storm»
2010: Patchwork (NorCD)
2012: Spinnaker (NorCD)
2019: Flotsam (NorCD)

Within "Line Up»
1998: Line Up (NorCD)
2004: Out From A Cool Storage (NorCD)

Within "Sketch»
1999: Sketch (Via Jazz)

Within "Robert Rook Trio»
2008: Hymn For Fall (NorCD)

Collaborative works 
2005: East of the Sun (Bluejack Jazz), Axel Hagen, Jimmy Halperin
2005: Dangerous Cats Live(Ultimate Jazz Records), Robert Rook
2005: Heart and Song (TWA Music), within Henriette Andersen Trio
2005: Trapperdetrap 2 Pom Pom Politieman (Byton Records)
2007: Dangerous Cats 2 (Ultimate Jazz Records), Robert Rook Live at Bimhuis
2008: Live in Amsterdam (Ultimate Jazz Records), Robert Rook Trio DVD
2010: Tribute To Jochem (Ultimate Jazz Records), Robert Rook
2013: Momentum (OAP Records), Robert Rook
2013: Shadows (Hipsecu), Olaf Zwetsloot Quartet
2017: From This Moment On (Indie), Simone Honijk
2018: Another Day At The Office (Axel Hagen Music), Axel Hagen Olaf Tarenskeen
2020: Chaimber9 Plays Ellington and Strayhoorn  (Axel Hagen Music), Axel Hagen

Awards
Independent Music Awards 2013: Spinnaker – Best Jazz Album

References

External links
Thomas Winther Andersen Official Website

Norwegian jazz upright-bassists
Male double-bassists
Jazz double-bassists
Norwegian composers
Norwegian male composers
Musicians from Oslo
1969 births
Living people
21st-century double-bassists
21st-century Norwegian male musicians
Male jazz musicians
NorCD artists